A national retail sales tax (NRST) is a type of retail sales tax levied on a national level, a sales tax levied on retail sales. 

Taxes and proposals for such taxes include:

 FairTax (U.S.A.), a proposal to replace most existing nationally levied taxes with a single retail sales tax
 nationally levied consumer value-added tax (VAT)
 Value-added tax (United Kingdom)
 nationally levied consumer goods and services tax (GST)
 Goods and Services Tax (Australia)
 Goods and Services Tax (Canada)
 Goods and Services Tax (Hong Kong)
 Goods and Services Tax (New Zealand)
 Goods and Services Tax (Singapore)

See also
 Consumption tax

Sales taxes
Tax terms